Coenraad bleskop George van Wyk (born 8 January 1988) is a South African rugby union footballer. He plays either as a fly-half or full-back. Currently, he represents Toshiba Brave Lupus in the Japanese Top League.

In 2013, he was included in the South Africa President's XV team that played in the 2013 IRB Tbilisi Cup. The team won the tournament when it went undefeated after all three matches.

He signed for the  prior to the 2015 Super Rugby season.

Nickname  "bleskop van wyk"

References

External links

itsrugby.co.uk profile

1988 births
Living people
Afrikaner people
Cheetahs (rugby union) players
Expatriate rugby union players in Japan
Free State Cheetahs players
Griffons (rugby union) players
Griquas (rugby union) players
Lions (United Rugby Championship) players
Pumas (Currie Cup) players
Rugby union fly-halves
Rugby union fullbacks
Rugby union players from Bellville, South Africa
Shimizu Koto Blue Sharks players
South African expatriate rugby union players
South African expatriate sportspeople in Japan
South African people of Dutch descent
South African rugby union players
Stellenbosch University alumni
Toshiba Brave Lupus Tokyo players
Western Province (rugby union) players